Blaž Kavčič was the defending champion but chose not to defend his title.

Peter Polansky won the title after defeating Ugo Humbert 6–4, 1–6, 6–2 in the final.

Seeds

Draw

Finals

Top half

Bottom half

References
Main Draw
Qualifying Draw

Challenger Banque Nationale de Granby - Men's Singles
2018 Men's Singles